The International charter for walking is an initiative undertaken by 'Walk21' to encourage walking in urban areas for benefits to health, the environment and the economy.

International scope
 The government of the Australian Capital Territory is a signatory to the charter.
 The Mayor of Stuttgart signed the charter on July 20, 2011.
 Geelong, Victoria signed the charter on August 9, 2011.
 The Mayor of Ottawa], Ontario, Canada signed the charter. November 9, 2011

Walk21 conference venues

 2017 -  Calgary
 2016 - Hong Kong
 2015 - Vienna
 2014 - Sydney
 2013 - Munich
 2012 - Mexico City
 2011 - Vancouver
 2010 - The Hague
 2009 - New York City
 2008 - Barcelona
 2007 - Toronto
 2006 - Melbourne
 2005 - Zurich
 2004 - Copenhagen
 2003 - Portland, Oregon
 2002 - San Sebastián, Spain
 2001 - Perth, Western Australia
 2000 - London

See also
 Bicycle-friendly
 Bicycle-friendly communities in America
 Cycling infrastructure
 New Urbanism
 Pedestrian-friendly
 Public transport
 Shared space
 Walkability
 Walking

References

Health campaigns
Exercise organizations
Urban planning
Pedestrian infrastructure